Christoph Nicht (born 5 January 1994) is an Austrian professional footballer who plays as a goalkeeper for Grazer AK.

External links
 
 

1994 births
Living people
People from Bruck an der Mur
Association football goalkeepers
Austrian footballers
Austrian expatriate footballers
Kapfenberger SV players
Naxxar Lions F.C. players
SK Austria Klagenfurt players
Grazer AK players
2. Liga (Austria) players
Austrian Regionalliga players
Maltese Premier League players
Austrian expatriate sportspeople in Malta
Expatriate footballers in Malta
Footballers from Styria